Distorsio constricta is a species of medium-sized sea snail, a marine gastropod mollusk in the family Personidae, the Distortio snails.

Subspecies 
 Distorsio constricta constricta (Broderip, 1833)
 Distorsio constricta mcgintyi Emerson & Puffer, 1953

Distribution

Description 
The maximum recorded shell length of Distorsio constricta mcgintyi is 65 mm.

Habitat 
Minimum recorded depth of Distorsio constricta mcgintyi is 25 m. Maximum recorded depth is 274 m.

References

Personidae
Gastropods described in 1833